Time of My Life is a 2012 Belgian film written and directed by Nic Balthazar. The story is based upon real life events and contains original news footage.

Plot 
The story is set between 1980 and 2002. In 1980 Mario Verstraete was a healthy Belgian with big ambitions. Some years later he is diagnosed with multiple sclerosis. Mario decides to advocate for legalizing euthanasia. He starts up an action group to convince the government to allow the practice under restricted conditions.

His plan works and the Belgian government approves an enactment on 28 May 2002: euthanasia is allowed when an adult victim can't be cured, has to live in unworthy conditions, and at least three doctors confirm this situation. Verstraete was the first Belgian to commit euthanasia on 30 September 2002.

Cast 
 Koen De Graeve - Mario Verstraete
 Geert Van Rampelberg - Thomas
  - Lynn
  - Roger
 Viviane de Muynck - Francine
  - Speck
 Felix Maesschalck - Milan
 Eva Van Der Gucht - Sask

Recognition

Awards 
The movie's awards include:
 Magritte Award for Best Flemish Film in Coproduction 2013
 Flemish Film Award for best movie at the Ostend Film Festival 2012
 Flemish Film Award for best actor at the Ostend Film Festival 2012
 Flemish Film Award for best editing at the Ostend Film Festival 2012
 Public favorite at the Seminci film festival in Spain
 Public favorite at The End film festival in Amsterdam
 Grand Prix Hydro-Québec at the International Film Festival of Abitibi

Nominations 

 Festroia International Film Festival 2012

References 

2012 films
2010s Dutch-language films
Films set in Belgium
Films about euthanasia
Magritte Award winners